Pieter Feddes van Harlingen (1586–1623), was a Dutch Golden Age painter.

Biography
According to Houbraken, who only saw his etchings, he signed his name P. Harlingensis. In 1612 he left Harlingen for Leeuwarden. He influenced Jacob Adriaensz Backer.

References

External links

1586 births
1623 deaths
Dutch Golden Age painters
Dutch male painters
People from Harlingen, Netherlands
Frisian painters